The 1979 Southern Miss Golden Eagles football team was an American football team that represented the University of Southern Mississippi as an independent during the 1979 NCAA Division I-A football season. In their fifth year under head coach Bobby Collins, the team compiled a 6–4–1 record.

Schedule

References

Southern Miss
Southern Miss Golden Eagles football seasons
Southern Miss Golden Eagles football